Fierce Light: When Spirit Meets Action is a 2008 documentary film written and directed by Velcrow Ripper that focuses on spiritual activism. Fueled by the belief that "another world" is possible, Ripper explores the stories of people who have turned to spiritual activism as a means to cope with personal and global crises.
The film contains interviews from Daryl Hannah, Thich Nhat Hanh, Desmond Tutu, Julia Butterfly Hill, Van Jones, Alice Walker, Joanna Macy, Noah Levine  and John Lewis. Others featured include Michael Beckwith, Sera Beak, Ralph Nader among many others such as the original inspiration for the film, Brad Will.

The film is produced by the Fiercelight Films Inc. and the National Film Board of Canada and is distributed by Alive Mind. The United Kingdom distributor is Dogwoof Pictures.

Awards
Fierce Light was voted most popular Canadian film and the recipient of a special mention in the nonfiction feature category at the Vancouver International Film Festival.

See also
Scared Sacred

References

External links
 
 

2008 films
English-language Canadian films
Canadian documentary films
Documentary films about spirituality
National Film Board of Canada documentaries
Films shot in Sri Lanka
2008 documentary films
Films directed by Velcrow Ripper
Desmond Tutu
Ralph Nader
2000s English-language films
2000s Canadian films